Alexander or Alex George may refer to:

Alex George (botanist) (born 1939), Australian botanist
Alexander L. George (1920–2006), American political scientist
Alexander George (philosopher), American philosopher
Alex George (motorcyclist), Scottish Grand Prix motorcycle racer
Alex George (baseball) (born 1938), Major League Baseball player
Alex George (television personality) (born 1991), British doctor and reality television contestant

See also

George Alexander (disambiguation)